Kelli Marie Giddish (born April 13, 1980) is an American television, stage, and film actress. From 2011 to 2022, she has played NYPD Detective Amanda Rollins in the NBC crime-drama television series Law & Order: Special Victims Unit. Giddish previously played Di Henry on the ABC soap opera All My Children (2005–2007), Dr. Kate McGinn in the Fox crime-drama series Past Life (2010), and Annie Nolan Frost in the NBC crime-drama series Chase (2010–2011).

Early life
Giddish was born in Cumming, Georgia. She is the daughter of Charles and Nita Giddish, and she has a brother named Eli. Her paternal grandfather nudged her interest in acting along by taking her to the Fox Theatre in Atlanta. Her maternal grandmother was also very supportive of her interests. In Georgia, she attended Forsyth Central High School and was very involved with a local drama teacher named Yatesy Harvey, who was a friend of her mother and ran a community theater. For years in her youth Giddish performed in plays put on by Yatesy Harvey and participated in her sleepover drama camps. Of Harvey, Giddish has been quoted as saying “She just inspired a fierce curiosity and very high standards of what acting was and how much dedication it took and rehearsal and we would do plays every night." Giddish won a number of accolades in her youth. While at Forsyth Central, she was a member of their championship softball team and in 1998 she was the State Literary Champion for Girls Dramatic Interpretation. Later on she graduated from the University of Evansville in Indiana, where she majored in theater performance. Giddish received much family support of her acting, with her parents driving to Indiana to see her act in every college performance she was in. After college, she moved to NYC to pursue her acting career. Within a year of her arrival, she appeared in a Broadway play with Farrah Fawcett.

Career

2005–2010: Early career
Giddish portrayed Diana Henry on soap opera All My Children from 2005 to 2007. In July 2007, it was confirmed by Soap Opera Weekly magazine that Giddish and All My Children parted ways in a mutual decision and that she would make her final appearance as Di on September 19, 2007. Giddish appeared in the thriller film Death in Love (2008), which premiered at the Sundance Film Festival, and played the role of Courtney in the web series The Burg. The same people responsible for The Burg also created All's Faire, in which Giddish played the role of Cindy.

Giddish, Nicholas Bishop, and Ravi Patel were cast in Fox's reincarnation drama pilot Past Life. The WBTV-produced project revolved around past-life investigators. Giddish played a Ph.D. in psychology and cognitive research who believes in reincarnation. It was announced on May 18, 2009, that Fox had ordered Past Life to series, airing midseason 2010 at 9:00 PM EST on Tuesdays. It premiered on February 9, 2010, and was canceled on February 18.

Giddish starred as the central character, U.S. Marshal Annie Frost, in the police procedural drama Chase, which premiered on NBC in fall 2010. Giddish received rave reviews for her ability to play the lead character in the series, but it was pulled in early February 2011. On April 6, 2011, NBC decided to air five new episodes of Chase on Saturday nights with the first beginning on April 23, 2011.

2011–2022: Law & Order: Special Victims Unit 
In January 2007, Giddish guest starred on Law & Order: Special Victims Unit in the episode "Outsider" as rape victim Kara Bawson.

It was announced on June 27, 2011, that Giddish would join the cast of Law & Order: Special Victims Unit for its thirteenth season along with Cold Case Danny Pino coinciding with Christopher Meloni's departure from the series. Giddish told TV Guide during summer filming, "Everybody on the set is really excited and energized. They've lost a family member with Chris Meloni leaving, but they've been very accepting of us. Amanda is thrilled to be here working with these people, and so am I."

Giddish made her debut as Detective Amanda Rollins in the 13th-season premiere, "Scorched Earth", in which the character first works alongside Detective Olivia Benson (Mariska Hargitay). In an interview with TV Guide, Giddish said about her character, "My character is in complete awe of Olivia, Amanda's really eager to get in there because she knows her stuff and really eager to learn. She has come from Atlanta and there was a ceiling there, so she's come up to New York." Giddish felt great about joining the series in its 13th season, "I couldn't feel better about it. ... There's no intimidation, what attracted me was the prospect of re-invigorating a franchise that's been so well-known and so well-liked, and then to be the shaker and mover." Giddish expressed confidence that viewers would warm up to Rollins and another new character, Nick Amaro (Pino), with time. "They're going to love us because it's not being forced in their faces," she says. "The more you know about us and the more you see us in your living room, the more you're hopefully going to love us."

At the end of Season 13 of Law & Order: SVU, she weighed in on her first season, and she said she and Pino received not only a "very warm welcome" from SVUs cast and crew, but saw their respective characters explored more than they could hope for in their first season. "They've given me a lot to work with — and I hope they give me more next season," says Giddish. "We're still playing 'musical chairs' in terms of partners, and that's a great way to go about exploring the different characters."

Giddish's castmate Ice-T, who has portrayed Detective Odafin Tutuola since the show's second season, praised both Giddish and Pino in the wake of Meloni's departure: "We had to regroup, like a football team," said Ice-T. "The quarterback changed, but we still had to move the ball down the field. And we did well... Danny came in, strong. Kelli came in, strong. And we shut down the doubters."
On April 16, 2020, Giddish's character was promoted to 2nd grade class detective, in "Solving For The Unknowns".

Giddish’s final episode was season 24, episode 9 ("And a Trauma in a Pear Tree") in which Rollins married ADA Dominick Carisi Jr. and resigned from the Special Victims Unit to accept an offer to teach at Fordham University.

Other works
In 2011, Giddish appeared in the music video for "Nadine" by Project Jenny, Project Jan.

In May 2018, Giddish appeared in the music video for “All Love is Lost” by Body Count, Giddish's SVU co-star Ice-T's band, from their 2017 album Bloodlust with Max Cavalera from Soulfly and Cavalera Conspiracy as a special guest.

Personal life
Giddish married Lawrence Faulborn on June 20, 2015, in New Smyrna Beach, Florida. She gave birth to the couple's first child, a son named Ludo, in October 2015. Giddish gave birth to the couple's second child, a son named Charlie, in November 2018. Both of her pregnancies were written into Law & Order: Special Victims Unit. Giddish and Faulborn divorced in 2018. 

On November 7, 2021, Giddish married Beau Richards.

Filmography

Film

Television

References

External links

1980 births
Living people
American stage actresses
American television actresses
American film actresses
People from Cumming, Georgia
Actresses from Georgia (U.S. state)
University of Evansville alumni
21st-century American women